Richard Schuil (born 2 May 1973) is a beach volleyball player from the Netherlands.

Schuil was born in Leeuwarden, Friesland. A former volleyball player, he represented his native country in three consecutive Summer Olympics in volleyball, starting in 1996 in Atlanta, Georgia. There he won the gold medal with the Dutch Men's National Team by defeating archrivals Italy in the final (3-2).

After the 2004 Summer Olympics, he teamed with Reinder Nummerdor for a career in beach volleyball. The two won their first FIVB World Tour gold medal in 2007 at Valencia, Spain. To date they have won six gold medals. They have also appeared at two Olympic games.

Personal
Schuil married on 6 June 2009 the Dutch volleyball player Elke Wijnhoven. In March 2012, their daughter Lisa was born.

Individual awards
 2003 European Championship "Best Scorer"

References

  Dutch Olympic Committee

1973 births
Living people
Dutch men's volleyball players
Dutch men's beach volleyball players
Volleyball players at the 1996 Summer Olympics
Volleyball players at the 2000 Summer Olympics
Volleyball players at the 2004 Summer Olympics
Beach volleyball players at the 2008 Summer Olympics
Beach volleyball players at the 2012 Summer Olympics
Olympic volleyball players of the Netherlands
Olympic beach volleyball players of the Netherlands
Olympic gold medalists for the Netherlands
Olympic medalists in volleyball
Sportspeople from Friesland
Sportspeople from Leeuwarden
Medalists at the 1996 Summer Olympics
21st-century Dutch people
20th-century Dutch people